Michael Bunluen Mansap (April 2, 1929 – December 2, 2010) was the Roman Catholic bishop of the Roman Catholic Diocese of Ubon Ratchathani, Thailand.

Ordained in 1951, Bunluen Mansap was named bishop of the Ubon Ratchathani Diocese in 1976. Bishop Mansap retired from overseeing the diocese in 2006.  He died on December 2, 2010 at Bangkok hospital.  Bunluen Mansap was 81 years old.

Notes

20th-century Roman Catholic bishops in Thailand
1929 births
2010 deaths
21st-century Roman Catholic bishops in Thailand